Rituals of Power is the sixth studio album by American death metal band Misery Index. It was released on March 8, 2019, by Season of Mist.

Track listing

Personnel

Misery Index
Jason Netherton – bass guitar, lead and backing vocals
Mark Kloeppel – guitar, lead vocals
Adam Jarvis – drums
Darin Morris – lead guitar

Production
Ryan Vincent M – recording (at Apollo Audio Alternative)
Erik Rutan – recording (at Mana Recording)
Valtteri Kallio – recording (at Soundwell Studio)
Will Putney – mixing, mastering

Charts

References

2019 albums
Misery Index (band) albums
Season of Mist albums